Liam Marshall (born 9 May 1996) is an English rugby league footballer who plays as a er for the Wigan Warriors in the Super League.

He has spent time on loan from Wigan at the Swinton Lions in the Championship.

Background
Marshall was born in Lancashire, England.

Playing career

2016 
Loaned out to the Swinton Lions for the year, Marshall made an immediate impact establishing himself as the form winger in the Championship, and finished the year as the leading try scorer in the competition.

2017 
He made his first team début on 3 March 2017, against Leigh. Marshall also scored four tries on just his second game for the Warriors in a 38-16 win at the Warrington Wolves on 9 March 2017 and has already reached 10 tries in just 9 appearances for Wigan as of 24 April 2017.

He played in the 2017 Challenge Cup Final defeat by Hull F.C. at Wembley Stadium.

2018
Marshall made 22 appearances for Wigan in the 2018 season and scored 17 tries but missed the clubs 2018 Super League Grand Final victory over Warrington due to injury.

2019
Marshall played 23 games for Wigan in the 2019 season and scored 16 tries including Wigan's shock loss to Salford in the semi-final.

2020
Marshall made only nine appearances for Wigan in the 2020 season scoring six tries and missed the clubs grand final loss against St Helens R.F.C.

2021 & 2022
In round 1 of the 2022 Super League season, Marshall scored two tries in a 24-10 victory over Hull Kingston Rovers.
On 28 May 2022, Marshall scored the winning try for Wigan in their 2022 Challenge Cup Final victory over Huddersfield.
In round 21, Marshall scored a hat-trick in Wigan's 46-4 victory over Hull Kingston Rovers.

2023
In round 2 of the 2023 Super League season, Marshall scored four tries for Wigan in a 60-0 victory over Wakefield Trinity.
The following week, Marshall scored a hat-trick in Wigan's 36-0 victory over Castleford.

References

External links
Wigan Warriors profile
SL profile
Dream XIII: Lancashire

1996 births
Living people
English rugby league players
Rugby league players from Lancashire
Rugby league wingers
Swinton Lions players
Wigan Warriors players